The 2021–22 Supertaça de Angola (31st edition) was contested by Sagrada Esperança, the 2020–21 Girabola champion and Petro de Luanda, the 2020–21 Angola Cup winner. Sagrada Esperança won the match, making it its 1st super cup win.

Match details

See also
 2020–21 Angola Cup
 2020–21 Girabola
 2021–22 Petro de Luanda season

References

Supertaça de Angola
Super Cup